Naisten Mestis (from Mestaruussarja meaning 'Championship series') is the second-highest women's ice hockey league in Finland. The league was founded as Naisten I-divisioona (Women's First Division) in 1985 by the Finnish Ice Hockey Association when the number of teams playing in the Naisten SM-sarja (now 'Naisten Liiga') was limited. It was renamed Naisten Mestis prior to the 2012-13 season.

Series format 
The Mestis season format has changed many times since the founding of the league in 1985. The current format was introduced for the 2019–20 season.

Qualifiers

With the exception of the Naisten SM-liiga teams, all club representative teams start the season in the Mestis Qualifiers. Each team is grouped into a division of five to eight teams; the number of divisions is determined by the total number of teams competing and each division is loosely defined by geographic location, with proximate teams being grouped. Each team plays a total of fifteen or sixteen matches within their division. The points earned in the games determine the team's ranking within their division; victories earn three points, overtime victories earn two points, and overtime losses earn one point. Teams that rank forth or lower in each division at the end of the qualifiers do not qualify to play in the Mestis and continue the season in the Naisten Suomi-sarja. The qualifying round runs from the beginning of the season in September to late November or early December.

Cross qualifiers

The team with the highest point total from each division of the qualifiers moves on the cross qualifying round. If there are an odd number of divisions, the team with the highest point total of all remaining teams also moves on. The cross qualifiers are a round-robin tournament, each team faces all other participating teams once. The two teams earning the highest point totals at the end of the tournament continue their seasons in the Lower Division of the Naisten Liiga and have the opportunity to gain promotion to the Naisten Liiga for the following season. The teams ranked third and lower in the cross qualifiers continue the season in the Naisten Mestis regular season. The cross qualifying round is played in late November and/or early December.

Regular season

The teams ranked third and lower in the cross qualifiers and the teams that finished second or third in each division of the qualifiers fill the ranks of the Mestis regular season. If the number of divisions is odd, the third ranked team from the qualifiers with smallest point total does not qualify and moves to the Naisten Suomi-sarja so that an even number of teams is maintained in the Mestis. Each team in the regular season plays an equal number of games against each of the other teams. The regular season runs from January to March.

Teams participating in the 2022–2023 season

Qualifiers 
Teams listed by ranking at the conclusion of the qualifiers.

Lohko 1
 Saimaan Pallo (SaiPa), Lappeenranta
 Kiekko-Espoo Akatemia (K-Espoo Ak), Espoo
 KJT Haukat, Tuusula
 Pelicans, Lahti
 HIFK U18, Helsinki

Lohko 2
 HIFK Akatemia (HIFK Ak), Helsinki
 HPK Akatemia, Hämeenlinna
 TPS Akatemia, Turku
 Panelian Raikas (PaRa), Eura
 Salo HT, Salo
 Turku HC, Turku

Lohko 3
 Alavuden Peli-Veikot (APV), Alavus
 KalPa Akatemia (KalPa Ak), Kuopio
 Kärpät Akatemia (Kärpät Ak), Oulu
 Kiilat, Haapajärvi
 Jyvässeudun Kiekko (JyKi), Jyväskylä
 S-Kiekko, Seinäjoki
 LL-89 Red Lights, Lapinlahti

Regular season 

The top two teams from each group proceeded directly to the Naisten Mestis regular season, while the teams that finished third in each group – KJT Haukat, TPS Akatemia, and Kärpät Akatemia – played a single round-robin cross-qualification to determine the final two teams that would participate in the regular season. TPS Akatemia and all teams ranked fourth and lower in the qualifiers went on to populate the Naisten Suomi-sarja regular season.

Teams in previous seasons
The teams that qualified for the Naisten Mestis regular season, listed by overall rank at the end of the regular season.

2017–18
1. TPS2. Sport3. JYP4. RoKi5. Hermes6. Red Wings7. KalPa Ak8. Puhti

2018–19
1. HIFK2. RoKi3. Hermes4. APV5. JYP6. Kärpät Ak

2019–20
1. JYP2. Kärpät Ak3. KJT Haukat4. HIFK AK5. SaiPa6. YJK

2020–21
1. Kärpät Ak2. APV3. PaRa4. KOOVEE–. HIFK Ak–. K-Espoo Ak

2021–22
1. HIFK Ak2. K-Espoo Ak3. Kärpät Ak4. JYP5. HPK Akatemia6. KJT Haukat

Series champions 
The manner in which the Mestis Championship is won has changed many times since the founding of the league in 1985. It has, for example, been awarded to the most successful team in the regular season, the winner of Mestis playoffs (which have repeatedly changed format or not been held), or to the team able to win promotion through the Naisten Liiga qualification/relegation series. The winner of the Naisten Mestis has not been historically guaranteed a place in the Naisten Liiga for the following season.

 1986: Shakers, Kerava
 1987: Tiikerit, Hämeenlinna
 1988: Ilves-Kiekko, Tampere
 1989: Tiikerit, Hämeenlinna
 1990: Espoon Kiekkoseura (EKS), Espoo
 1991: Ketterä, Imatra...
 2001: Hämeenlinnan Pallokerho, Hämeenlinna
 2002: Turun Palloseura (TPS), Turku
 2003: Turun Palloseura (TPS), Turku
 2004: Lohjan Kisa-Veikot (LoKV), Lohja
 2005: Turun Palloseura (TPS), Turku
 2006: Etelä-Vantaan Urheilijat (EVU), Vantaa
 2007: Alavuden Peli-Veikot (APV), Kuortane
 2008: Salo Hockey Team (Salo HT), Salo
 2009: Alavuden Peli-Veikot (APV), Kuortane
 2010: Kalevan Pallo (KalPa), Kuopio
 2011: Itä-Helsingin Kiekko (IHT), Helsinki
 2012: Keski-Uudenmaan Juniorikiekkoilun Tuki (KJT), Kerava
 2013: Keski-Uudenmaan Juniorikiekkoilun Tuki (KJT), Kerava
 2014: Rovaniemen Kiekko (RoKi), Rovaniemi
 2015: Lapinlahden Luistin -89 Red Lights (LL-89), Lapinlahti

Champions, 2016–present

See also 
 Naisten Liiga
 Women's ice hockey in Finland

References 
Content in this article is translated from the existing Finnish Wikipedia article at :fi:Naisten Mestis; see its history for attribution.

External links 
 League information and statistics from Eliteprospects.com and Hockeyarchives.info 

1985 establishments in Finland
Ice hockey leagues in Finland
Second tier ice hockey leagues in Europe
Sports leagues established in 1985
Women's ice hockey leagues in Europe
Women's sports leagues in Finland